Raillardella is a genus of flowering plants in the tribe Madieae within the family Asteraceae.

The genus is native to the western United States (Oregon, California, and Nevada).

 Species
 Raillardella argentea -  California, Oregon, western Nevada
 Raillardella pringlei -  California (Trinity + Siskiyou Cos)
 Raillardella scaposa - California, Oregon, western Nevada

 formerly included
see Anisocarpus Arnica Carlquistia 
 Raillardella muirii - Carlquistia muirii  
 Raillardella paniculata - Arnica viscosa  
 Raillardella scabrida - Anisocarpus scabridus

References

Madieae
Asteraceae genera
Flora of the Western United States